Radzin may refer to:

 Radzyń Podlaski, town in eastern Poland
 Izhbitza-Radzin, Hasidic dynasty